Weedon Lois Castle was a castle in the village of Weedon Lois, Northamptonshire, England. The castle was the caput baroniae of the barony of Weedon or Weedon Pinkeney.

A ringwork castle was constructed around the late 11th century by Ghilo of Picquigni, a Norman soldier. The surname was anglicised as Pinkeney, with the Pinkeney family holding the castle until the late 13th century.

References
Salter, Mike, 2002, The Castles of the East Midlands. Folly Publications, 2002.

Castles in Northamptonshire